The 2019 Saint-Martin Senior League is the 47th season of the Saint-Martin Senior League, the main football league in Saint-Martin. The season began on 13 January 2019. Junior Stars won the title.

League table

References

Football competitions in the Collectivity of Saint Martin
Saint-Martin